SoccerPlus Connecticut is an American women's soccer team, founded in 2006. The team is a member of the Women's Premier Soccer League, the third tier of women's soccer in the United States and Canada. The team plays in the North Division of the East Conference.

The team plays its home games at the Veterans Memorial Stadium in New Britain, Connecticut. The club's colors are red and white.

Players

Current roster

Notable former players
The following former players have played at the professional and/or international level:
 Niki Cross  
 Manya Makoski 
 Brett Maron  
 Tiffany Weimer 
 Katie Schoepfer

Year-by-year

Honors
 WPSL East North Division Champions 2008

Competition history
 2007 USASA U23 - National Champions
 2007 USASA Open Cup - Bronze medal

Coaches
  Tony DiCicco 2007-2008
  Lisa Cole 2007-2008
 Chris Bart-Williams 2009–Present, Former Sheffield Wednesday and FA Premier League player.
 Eleri Earnshaw 2009–Present, Former Arsenal Ladies and FA Women's Premier League player.

Stadia
 Veterans Stadium (New Britain, CT) 2007–present

References

External links
 Official Site
 WPSL SoccerPlus Connecticut page

Women's Premier Soccer League teams
Women's soccer clubs in the United States
Soccer clubs in Connecticut
Sports in New Britain, Connecticut
2006 establishments in Connecticut
Association football clubs established in 2006